Hotaru Beam is a binary-determination logic puzzle published by Nikoli.

Description

Hotaru Beam is played on a rectangular grid, usually of dashed lines, in which numbers in circles appear at some of the intersections on the grid.  Additionally, each circle has a dot on one of the grid lines leading into the circle.

Rules (translated from Nikoli)

 Draw a line from each white circle's black dot to any white circle, following the grid's horizontal and vertical markings.
 Lines cannot be drawn from a black dot to another black dot, nor can they be drawn from a white circle not at its black dot to a white circle not at its black dot.
 No crossing or branching of lines is acceptable. At the end, the drawn lines will connect all white circles to form a single, contiguous network.
 The number on the white circle dictates how many times the line you draw from its black dot must bend before it meets another white circle.

Solution methods

A circle with 0 on it (not the same as a blank circle) is a given: It will have at least one line going straight in the direction of the dot until it hits another circle.  Each circle will have a line coming out of it in the direction of the dot.  Since turning at the corner of the grid counts as a turn, a 1 circle near the corner may be forced to simply continue along the edge of the grid.

See also
 List of Nikoli puzzle types

References

 Nikoli's description of the puzzle (in Japanese), with example.

Logic_puzzles